Melanophryniscus cambaraensis is a species of toad in the family Bufonidae.
It is endemic to Brazil.
Its natural habitats are subtropical or tropical moist lowland forests, moist savanna, subtropical or tropical seasonally wet or flooded lowland grassland, rivers, intermittent freshwater marshes, and canals and ditches.
It is threatened by habitat loss.

References

External links
Brazilian red-belly toad (Melanophryniscus cambaraensis) Arkive.org.

Cambaraensis
Endemic fauna of Brazil
Amphibians described in 1979
Taxonomy articles created by Polbot
Fauna of the Atlantic Forest